T K Radhakrishnan (1919-2003) was a Carnatic classical flautist from Madras, India.

External links
 

Venu players
1919 births
2003 deaths
20th-century flautists